The 2006 Categoría Primera B season is the 17th season since its founding and is officially called the 2006 Copa Premier for sponsorship reasons.

League stage

Final 
The final match was canceled after La Equidad was awarded the two tournaments of the year and ascend directly to the Categoría Primera A. Therefore, the second in a series in tournament games played back and forth to define the team would play the series of promotion.

Promotion/relegation playoff 
As the second worst team in the relegation table, Atlético Huila had to play a two-legged tie against Valledupar F.C., the final match winner 2006 Categoría Primera B. As the Primera A team, Huila will play the second leg at home. The winner will be determined by points, followed by goal difference, then a penalty shootout. The winner will be promoted/remain in the Primera A for the 2007 season, while the loser will be relegated/remain in the Primera B.

External links 
 Official Site of Primera B (Spanish)
 Web of Primera B in Dimayor
 History of Primera B

Categoría Primera B seasons
2006 in Colombian football
Colombia